Shangdi station  is a station on Line 13 of the Beijing Subway.

Station Layout 
The station has 2 at-grade side platforms.

Exits 
There is 1 exit, lettered A, which is accessible.

References

External links

Beijing Subway stations in Haidian District